Tripling may refer to:
 Multiplication – multiplying a number by 3
 Rule of three (writing) – creating an expression with three parts to make it more effective
 TVF Tripling – an Indian web series